Pinoy Big Brother: Teen Edition retroactively known as Pinoy Big Brother Teen Edition 1 is the first teen season of the Philippine ABS-CBN reality television series Pinoy Big Brother and the third season overall.

The season began airing on April 23, 2006, three weeks after the end of the first Celebrity Edition. Unlike its British counterpart, the Teen Edition closely resembled its regular counterpart.

Mariel Rodriguez took over as main host of the primetime edition, while former Celebrity Edition contestant Bianca Gonzalez hosted the UpLate edition of the show. Toni Gonzaga on the other hand returned only to host The Big Night.

After 42 Days in the house and various other locations, Kim Chiu was named the winner with Mikee Lee being named the runner-up.

Development

Auditions 
During the last few days of the First Celebrity Edition, auditions in Cebu City, Davao City, and Metro Manila were announced, and 30,000 teenagers answered the audition call. Of these, twelve housemates were selected: eight represented the Luzon area while four came from the Visayas and Mindanao.

Prizes 
The prizes for the Big Winner included a condominium unit in Valenzuela City, a livelihood showcase, one million pesos, and an all-expense-paid trip to any Philippine destination.

Overview

House 
For this edition, the house was redecorated with a pop art theme. The colours of the walls were changed, and even the living area had a mural with pop art depictions of Mao Zedong, Bruce Lee, and Marilyn Monroe, to name a few. The housemates were also provided with a foosball table and some trampolines.

Theme Song 
The theme song for this new edition was "Kabataang Pinoy" (Filipino Youth) by Itchyworms. The new theme song was first performed by the band during the first Celebrity Edition's finale on April 1, 2006.

Housemates
The twelve initial housemates were introduced in the grand welcome party on Day 1, April 23, 2006, near the facade of the Pinoy Big Brother house. They were transported through motorbikes before they were introduced onstage and were sent to enter the house. The ages of the housemates were their ages as of the time of their entry to the Big Brother house. Origin indicates where the housemates were born or based before joining the program.

As a result of Aldred Gatchalian's voluntary exit on Day 7 and Bam Romana's forced eviction on Day 14, two replacement housemates were introduced in the house. On Day 9 (May 1, 2006), Joaqui Mendoza entered the Big Brother house as Aldred's replacement, while on Day 15 (May 7, 2006), Brenda Fox entered as Bam's replacement.

Chronology
For the first week, traffic lights and road signs were installed in the house to teach the housemates about the traffic rules in place in their country.
 April 23: The 12 housemates entered the house by pairs.
 April 26: As Big Brother's request, Kim sang her rendition of Emil Chou's song Peng You (朋友). Unknown to her, her singing was overheard by everybody in the house. Peng You would not only become Kim's "signature song," but would also have a Filipino version to be sung not just by her, but also with her favorite band MYMP.
 April 30: First nomination night - Mikki, Olyn, and Niña were nominated.
 May 1: Joaqui entered the house as Aldred's replacement.
 May 4: Big Brother announced that aside from either Niña or Olyn, the two remaining nominees for eviction, one from among the other housemates will be evicted forcedly from the house that coming Saturday.
 May 7: Second nomination night - Joaqui, Fred, Jamilla, and Clare were nominated. Brenda entered the house as Bam's replacement.
 May 14: Third nomination night - Matt, Mikee, and Olyn were nominated.
 May 15–20: The housemates did various sacrifices so Jamilla's son Miggy would complete the five operations needed to correct his cleft palate:
The girls would have all of their locks of hair braided on each other, literally forming an adhesive group.
The boys would act and walk like ducks; they were provided with flippers to simulate webbed feet.
An activity called Operation Smile where the housemates should keep smiling for two days. When the housemates failed on that particular sacrifice and Brenda offered to voluntarily leave the house, Big Brother directed the housemates to do a modified version of Operation Smile by having one housemate continually smile while having his/her mouth (and its surrounding area) painted red until he/she gets tired, at which point another housemate should take over.
Big Brother offered these sacrifices after he informed Jamilla that a group of surgeons agreed to give Miggy the four more operations at no charge. Prior to Jamilla's entry into the house, Miggy already had one operation done.
 May 19: To celebrate his birthday, Frankie, a tall man dressed as Frankenstein's monster, set up a dating game in which Olyn won. Olyn thought she won a date with former Celebrity Housemate Zanjoe Marudo when in fact, Zanjoe only acted as Frankie's mouthpiece. To complete the effect, Olyn was made over into the monster's bride, much to her horror. Most of the housemates were shocked at the sight of Frankie, but later overcame that fear when they found out that the tall man is just harmless. Olyn, being afraid of a lot of things, was the last one to realize the monster's friendliness. Frankie first appeared in the first season to scare the wits out of the housemates, especially Uma and, to some lesser extent, Sam, and celebrate Halloween with them. His second ever appearance was meant as a practical joke for Olyn to reveal another one of her fears and help her overcome it.
 May 20: After Matt and Olyn's exit, it was announced that instead of another nomination night, the next round of voting would be to select the final four housemates. The two housemates with the lowest number of votes would be evicted, while the remaining four would contend for the big prize.
May 21: The two remaining male housemates, Gerald and Mikee engaged in a "Teen Debate," hosted by Season 1 Housemate Jason Gainza. The arguments topics were spontaneous, albeit humorous. The winner in each argument was splashed with goo by the female housemates. Gerald defeated Mikee, 3–2; he won a "carnival" date with Kim with some "dirty ice cream" and cotton candy. Big Brother later announced the voting mechanics already mentioned above.
May 24: The housemates temporarily exited the house to shop at SM Mall of Asia for toys as gifts for young cancer patients. Upon their return to the house, they busied themselves with wrapping the toys. Of course, the housemates had limited contact during their brief time outside.
May 29: For the final week of the Teen Edition, Kim and Gerald were whisked away to an isolated house in the Hundred Islands National Park, Alaminos, Pangasinan, while Mikee and Clare were cluelessly left behind, not knowing where their two friends were. This "island adventure" was announced to viewers the previous Saturday. Going to the Hundred Islands National Park is part of the final task for the final four housemates and they will use their scuba diving skills there.
May 30: Early in the morning, Mikee and Clare were brought to the Hundred Islands. The two assumed that they would do a "secret elf" task. Mikee and Clare met up with Gerald and Kim later in the day.
May 31: Gerald was sent back early to the Big Brother House in Manila as disciplinary action for cheating at a task back at the Hundred Islands. While collecting garbage in that particular task, he placed a rock among the garbage he collected and effectively made the garbage bag heavier. He spent the rest of the day picking up rocks, talking to himself, and apologizing to everybody.
June 1: After three days in the Hundred Islands, Mikee, Kim, and Clare returned to the Big Brother house in Manila.

Nomination History
The housemate first mentioned in each nomination gets two points, while the second gets one point. As two housemates will go out every week, three nominees are put up for eviction every week. For the first nomination, one housemate was evicted for two consecutive evictions on Day 11 and 14. For the next three eviction nights, on Day 21, Day 28 and Day 35, two housemates were evicted per night.

:  On Day 7, Aldred voluntarily left the house before the first nominations due to homesickness. He was replaced by Joaqui.:  As Aldred's replacement, Joaqui entered the house. He was not able to take part in the nominations for the week and hence, is exempt from eviction. On Day 14, Bam was forcibly evicted due to his violations. See Elimination notes section.
:  On Day 15, Brenda entered the house as Bam's replacement; for being a new entrant she was exempt from that week's nominations.:  Open voting was announced after Matt and Olyn's exit from the house.

Elimination notes
Aldred -  Since the show started, he had a difficult time adjusting to his new environment and new housemates and he never resolved his problems. So he made up his mind on Day 6 to take a voluntary exit the next day. News of this reached his fellow housemates, who were saddened by it because of his good impression to them. The day of his exit was supposed to be the day of the first nomination night, but his exit moved the schedule of the nomination process to the next day. Two days later, new housemate Joaqui took his place. It was widely speculated before he left that Aldred was the housemate rumored to be underaged, hence his voluntary exit. However, in his first interview a week after his exit, the main reason is homesickness and the pressure to fit in.
Mikki - With 26.4% of the vote among the three nominated housemates, she was the first housemate officially evicted from the house on Day 11. The other two unnamed housemates had 42.3% and 31.3% of the remaining votes.
Bam - Among the four housemates mentioned by Big Brother, he committed the gravest violations, and therefore was forcibly evicted by Big Brother on Day 14. This was done as disciplinary action for violations such as talking without the lapel microphone, writing using pen and paper, using hand signals, whispering, talking when told not to, etc. The next day, new housemate Brenda entered the house to take Bam's place.
Niña - With 42.7% of the votes, she became the second housemate officially evicted from the house on Day 14 following Bam. Olyn, the other nominee that week, earned 57.3%.
Joaqui and Fred - On Day 21, both Joaqui and Fred were evicted from the house as they were the two lowest vote-getters among the four nominees. They each obtained only 12.6% and 19.5% of the total number of votes, respectively. The two other nominees, Clare and Jamilla, got 28% and 39.9% of the votes, respectively. It was announced after Niña's exit that two housemates would be evicted on the same night every week until four are left in the house.
Olyn and Matt - On Day 28, both Olyn and Matt were evicted from the house as Mikee obtained the most votes among the three nominees. Olyn and Matt obtained 18.8% and 32% of the vote respectively while Mikee got 49.2%.
Brenda and Jamilla - On Day 35, both Brenda and Jamilla were the final evictees, having received 8.4 and 12.7% votes, respectively. The remaining housemates each received of 14%, 17%, 17.5%, and 30.4% of the vote, with the identities of the housemates who earned each percentage withheld. That is because the same votes will be used to determine the winner of the edition.

Big Night
On June 3, 2006, at the Aliw Theater in Pasay, Kim Chiu was crowned the winner of the first Teen Edition, garnering 41.4% or 626,562 votes of the final votes cast since Day 29. Mikee Lee came in second with 20.7% or 313,032 votes, while Gerald Anderson in third with 19.4% or 293,234 votes. Clare Cabiguin was the first to come out among the final four, garnering 18.5% or 279,390 votes. A record 1,512,218 votes were cast in the Big Night.

The Teen Big Four entered in a boat and was escorted to a waiting room. Soon the winners were declared one after the other. The Big Night was entitled A Fairy Tale Finale, therefore all the sets and costumes were fairy tale related. The final four were also addressed as princes and princesses. The Fourth and Third Big Placers received a cash prize of PhP 100,000, a college scholarship and a trip to a local destination. The Second Teen Big Placer received a cash prize of PhP 500,000, a college scholarship and a trip to a local destination. The Teen Big Winner received a cash prize of PhP 1,000,000, a college scholarship, a trip to a local destination and a condominium unit to Chatteau Valenzuela.

The finale also marked Toni Gonzaga's return to the show as host.

See also
Pinoy Dream Academy
Star Circle Quest
StarStruck

References

External links

 Pinoy Big Brother Teen Edition: ABS-CBN Official Website
 Pinoy Big Brother Teen Edition at Telebisyon.net

2006 Philippine television seasons